John Jacob Astor III (June 10, 1822 – February 22, 1890) was an American financier, philanthropist and a soldier during the American Civil War. He was a prominent member of the Astor family, becoming the wealthiest member in his generation and the founder of the English branch of the family.

Early life
Astor was the eldest son of real estate businessman William Backhouse Astor Sr. and Margaret Alida Rebecca Armstrong. His younger brother, businessman William Backhouse Astor Jr., became the patriarch of the male line of American Astors.

His paternal grandparents were fur-trader John Jacob Astor and Sarah Cox Todd. Astor's maternal grandparents were Senator John Armstrong Jr. and Alida Livingston of the Livingston family.

John Astor III studied at Columbia College, graduating in 1839, and the University of Göttingen, following which he went to Harvard Law School, graduating in 1842. He practiced law for a year, to qualify for assisting in the management of his family's immense estate, one half of which later descended to him. It was based on his paternal grandfather's achieving a monopoly in the lucrative fur trade in the early nineteenth century.

Career
In business, Astor dabbled in railroad investment, but was outsmarted by Commodore Cornelius Vanderbilt and forced to yield control of the original New York Central Railroad line (from Albany to Buffalo) to him. His principal business interest was the vast Astor Estate real estate holdings in New York City, which he managed profitably and parsimoniously.

Military service
Astor was elected lieutenant colonel of the 12th Regiment of the New York Militia.  He resigned from the office in 1853.

During the American Civil War, Astor served as a volunteer aide-de-camp, with the rank of colonel, to Major General George B. McClellan (then commanding general of the U.S. Army) from November 30, 1861, to July 11, 1862.  In recognition of his services during the Peninsular Campaign, Astor was brevetted as a brigadier general of Volunteers in March 1865.

In 1880 he became a companion of the New York Commandery of the Military Order of the Loyal Legion of the United States—a military society of officers who had served in the Union armed forces.  He was assigned insignia number 1909.

He regarded his Civil War service as the best of his life and attended the reunions of the Loyal Legion with zeal.

Philanthropy
Astor donated objects and funds to the Metropolitan Museum of Art (in 1887 he presented it with his wife's collection of valuable laces and left a bequest of $50,000). He and his brother presented Trinity Church with a memorial to their father: a sculptured reredos and altar costing $80,000. He left a bequest of $450,000 to the Astor Library, bringing the family benefactions to the institution to a total of about $1,500,000. He also gave generously to the New York Cancer Hospital ($100,000 bequest), the Woman's Hospital, St. Luke's Hospital ($100,000 bequest) and the Children's Aid Society.

He took an active interest in the Astor Library beyond funding. He was treasurer of its board of trustees, and in 1879 deeded to it the three lots on which the northern wing of the present building was later constructed by him. He presented it with his collection of early books and rare manuscripts.

His deeply religious wife Charlotte supported the newly formed Children's Aid Society and sat on the board of the Women's Hospital of New York, an institution that to her dismay refused to accept cancer patients. She persuaded her husband to donate the money ($225,000) to erect the New York Cancer Hospital's first wing, the "Astor Pavilion." For twenty years, she supported a German industrial school. From 1872 until her death, she was a manager of the Woman's Hospital, besides taking an active part in the Niobrara League to aid the Indians and in many other charities. She bequeathed $150,000 to charitable organizations.

Personal life

On December 9, 1846, Astor was married at Trinity Church in New York City to Charlotte Augusta Gibbes (February 27, 1825 – December 12, 1887). Her parents were Thomas Stanyarne Gibbes Jr. and Susan Annette Vanden Heuvel. She was a descendent of Charles Apthorp, Jan Cornelius Van den Heuvel, and SC Governor Robert Gibbes. Together, they had one child, William Waldorf Astor in 1848, who later became the 1st Viscount Astor, who married Mary Dahlgren Paul.

In 1859, he built a home at 338 Fifth Avenue, today the street address of the Empire State Building. Later, he had an imposing vacation home, Beaulieu, built in Newport, Rhode Island, and he had a country estate, Nuits, at Ardsley-on-Hudson in Irvington, New York.  Astor increasingly visited London in his later years. His son moved there permanently with his family in 1891 and became a British citizen in 1899 later being made Lord Astor.

John Jacob Astor III died on February 22, 1890, and was interred in the Trinity Church Cemetery in Manhattan.

Notes

References

External links

1822 births
1890 deaths
John Jacob
American philanthropists
American financiers
Union Army officers
People of New York (state) in the American Civil War
University of Göttingen alumni
Harvard Law School alumni
American railway entrepreneurs
Livingston family
Burials at Trinity Church Cemetery
Columbia College (New York) alumni